Hip Hop Music Awards 2001 is the third (and final to date) annual album produced by the magazine to focus on its nominees of the now-defunct award show.  It features nineteen hip hop and rap hits (two of them being bonus tracks).  It went to number 34 on the Top R&B/Hip Hop Albums chart and peaked at number 28 on the Billboard 200 album chart.The show was live to tape and produced by Bruno White entertainment Orlando, Fl. Edited by Shane Lord

This is the only The Source Hip Hop Music Awards compilation to feature a Billboard Hot 100 and R&B and Hip Hop number one hit: Ms. Jackson.  In addition to that song, two more songs (out of three) made number one on the Hot Rap Tracks chart: Bow Wow (That's My Name) and Oh No.

Track listing
 Ms. Jackson - Outkast
 Southern Hospitality - Ludacris
 How Many Licks? - Lil' Kim and Sisqo
 Bonnie & Shyne - Shyne and Barrington Levy
 Who's That Girl? - Eve
 The Blast - Talib Kweli f. Vinia Mojica
 Pull Ova - Trina
 Lay Low - Snoop Dogg, Master P, Nate Dogg, Butch Cassidy and Tha Eastsidaz
 Bow Wow (That's My Name) - Lil Bow Wow and Snoop Dogg
 Gravel Pit - Wu-Tang Clan
 Look Me In My Eyes - Scarface
 E.I. - Nelly
 Shake Ya Ass - Mystikal
 X - Xzibit
 Ante Up (Robbing-Hoodz Theory) - M.O.P. and Funkmaster Flex
 Put It On Me - Ja Rule and Vita
 Keep It Thoro - Prodigy
 Making It - The Poe Boy Family, Rick Ross and Brisco
 Oh No - Mos Def, Pharoahe Monch and Nate Dogg

References

Hip hop compilation albums
2001 compilation albums
Def Jam Recordings compilation albums